Thomas Louis O'Malley (July 23, 1925 – June 11, 2011) was a quarterback in the National Football League. He was a member of the Green Bay Packers during the 1950 NFL season. He played for the Ottawa Rough Riders of the Canadian Football League from 1951 to 1953, leading them to the 39th Grey Cup, winning it 21−14. He played college football at Cincinnati. In his one NFL game he threw six interceptions.

Early life
Tom O'Malley was born on July 23, 1925 in Cincinnati, Ohio. He went to high school at Hughes (OH). After High School, he was in the navy for three years.

College career
O'Malley joined the Cincinnati Bearcats after serving in the navy. His first year of college was in 1946. He was their starting quarterback in all four of his college years. He was drafted in the 6th round (45) of the 1949 AAFC Draft by the Cleveland Browns but continued college. In 1949 with new head coach Sid Gillman, he led the nation in passing yards. He also threw 16 touchdowns. Sid Gillman retired his number (27), but it did not stay retired.

Professional career

Cleveland Browns
In March, he was signed by the Cleveland Browns. He was originally drafted by them. He was traded on August 28 to the Green Bay Packers for a draft pick.

Green Bay Packers
He was traded to the Green Bay Packers for a draft pick. In week one rookie quarterback Tobin Rote started the game, but left in the second quarter due to a shoulder injury. Head Coach Gene Ronzani put in O'Malley to replace the injured Rote. He completed 4 of 15 passes for 31 yards. He set a single-game Packers record with six interceptions. One interception was returned for a touchdown. It was a 56-yard interception return by Clarence Self. The Packers lost to the Detroit Lions 45-7. His longest completion was twenty yards. He also had one rush for -9 yards. He wore number 76 and was the only quarterback to wear that number. His passer rating was 0. He was released three days later.

Erie Vets
He briefly played for the Erie Vets of the American Football League/American Association. He was the backup quarterback for Butch Songin. With the Vets he completed 22 of 63 attempts for 405 yards, 1 touchdown, and 6 interceptions. The Vets lost the final American Association championship to the Richmond Rebels.

Ottawa Rough Riders
From 1951 to 1953, he was the starting quarterback for the Ottawa Rough Riders. In 1951, he played in 12 games and threw 20 touchdowns. He led the Rough Riders to the 39th Grey Cup, which they won 21-14. He also had one rushing touchdown in 1951. In 1952 he played 12 games and had 19 touchdown passes. In 1953 he played in 14 games and had 22 touchdown passes. He also had one rushing touchdown. 1953 was his final season. He played 38 games for the Rough Riders.

Later life
He was later inducted into the Cincinnai Bearcats Hall of Fame, Cincinnati Bearcats Ring of Honor, Nippert Stadium Ring of Honor, and James P. Kelly, Sr. UC Athletics Hall of Fame. He died on June 11, 2011 at the age of 85.

See also
 List of college football yearly passing leaders

References

External links
Just Sports Stats

1925 births
2011 deaths
American football quarterbacks
Cincinnati Bearcats football players
Green Bay Packers players
Ottawa Rough Riders players